Noodles is a Japanese alternative rock band currently consisting of Yoko (vocals/guitar) and Ikuno (bass). The band is originally from Yokohama, where they performed their first show.

They are well known for the song "Love My Life", which they recorded for the movie of the same name, Love My Life.

Discography

Studio albums
 The Gravity Thief (1995.02.24 Benten Label)
 Slow Coaster (1997.06.25 Benten Label)
 Long Long Chain (2001.12.12 Delicious Label)
 God Cable (2003.02.14 Delicious Label)
 Ivy (2005.04.13 Delicious Label)
 Cover Me Shakespeare (2006.07.13 Delicious Label)
 Metropolis (2007.10.17 Delicious Label)
 Snap (2008.10.15 Delicious Label)
 Explorer (2010.08.04 Delicious Label)
 Funtime (2012.09.05 Delicious Label)
 MAKE UP TO BREAK UP (2013.08.07 Delicious Label) (Cover album)
 Loafers on the Japantown (2014.12.10 Delicious Label)
Metallic Nocturne (2017.06.21 Delicious Label)
I'm not chic (2019.05.29 Delicious Label)

EPs
 Deep Beyond the Dream (夢の奥のもっと奥) (1998.06.25 Benten Label)
 6 Colors (1999.04.25 Benten Label)
 Lite Pop (1999.07.28 Delicious Label)
 Rainbow (1999.12.02 Delicious Label)
 Fuzz Hill (2004.4.26 Delicious Label)
 The Music Moves Me (2009.10.14 Delicious Label)

Singles
 "Booster" (2000.08.09 Delicious Label)
 "Hush Bell" (2001.01.24 Delicious Label)
 "Lesson 1" (2002.08.14 Delicious Label)
 We Are noodles From Sentimental (20th Anniversary Limited Single) (2011.08.10 Delicious Label)
 "Blood Waltz" (25th Anniversary Limited Single)  (2016.11.11 Delicious Label)

Compilations
 our first noodles (2009.10.14 Delicious Label) (DELICIOUS LABEL 10th Anniversary)

Compilations (with or by other artists)
 Benten Unplugged (1996 Benten Label)
 Factory CD (2000)
 Life is Delicious (2001.08.08 Delicious Label)
 My Room is Delicious Vol.1 (2001.09.25 Delicious Label)
 My Room is Delicious Vol.2 (2002.01.23  Delicious Label)
 Synchronized Rockers (シンクロナイズド・ロッカーズ) (2004 King Records)
 GO! DELICIOUS GO! (2005.11.2 Delicious Label)
 ELECTRIC RAYS (2008.05.28 Delicious Label)

Soundtracks
 Love My Life original soundtrack (2007.01.17 Delicious Label)

Videography
 NOODLES COME TRUE (1997.01.01 Benten Label) Printing limited to 1,000
 On the Wall (2005.01.01 Delicious Label)
 Delicious Bump Tour in USA (2005)
 Delicious Bump Show!! (various artists, 2006)
 We Are noodles (20th anniversary live DVD) (2012)

External links
 noodles official website

Japanese rock music groups
Japanese indie rock groups
Japanese alternative rock groups
Musical groups from Kanagawa Prefecture